Renix (Renix Electronique) was a joint venture by Renault and Bendix that designed and manufactured automobile electronic ignitions, fuel injection systems, electronic automatic transmission controls, and various engine sensors. Major applications included various Renault and Volvo vehicles. The name became synonymous in the U.S. with the computer and fuel injection system used on the AMC/Jeep 2.5 L I4 and 4.0 L I6 engines.

Use of name
The term Renix also has a number of applications. In certain carburetor equipped Renault and Volvo models, it provides an electronic ignition system, consisting of an engine control unit (ECU) to replace the job of contact breaker points in the distributor. The system uses an angle sensor and a number of fuel sensors to provide a maintenance-free ignition system. The ECU is sealed and cannot be serviced, and the EPROM cannot be re-programmed.

Later, the name was synonymous with a form of fuel injection. In such an application, it consisted of an ECU and a number of sensors. It is better known in America for its application in the AMC 4.0 L displacing  straight-6 engines. Production began by American Motors (AMC) with the 1987 Jeep Cherokee (XJ) models. It was preceded by the AMC Computerized Engine Control, and followed by Chrysler's Mopar MPI system.

Renix Electronique
Renix Electronique S.A., was established in 1981 as a joint venture by Renault with 51% interest and Bendix with 49% that was headquartered in Toulouse. Renix Corporation of America was the North American subsidiary of Renix Electronique to provide sales, logistics, engineering, and quality support to American Motors.

When Renault encountered financial troubles in 1985, it sold its interest in Renix to AlliedSignal, a major auto industry supplier and the new owner of Bendix. Renix Corporation of America was also absorbed by AlliedSignal Corporation when it purchased Renix Electronique from Renault. The US$200 million Allied buyout of Renault's 51% of Renix made it part of Bendix Electronics and Engine Controls. Renix products are produced in France and marketed worldwide under the Bendix brand name. In 1988, the French Bendix site was sold to Siemens VDO. In 2008, Siemens AG sold its VDO branch to Continental automotive group.

Renault applications
The Renix system was used in the F series engines as fitted to the Renault 19 16V, Renault 21 and Savanna/Nevada, the Renault 25, and the Renault Espace. It was a multi-point fuel injection system, as opposed to a single-point system, with a number of air, throttle and pinking sensors, and an advanced computer. Application of the system could first be seen in 1984, three years before its American debut. It could also be found in 2.2 L engines fitted to R21, 25, and Espace models.

The Renix fuel injection and a Garrett turbocharger was used in the mid-mounted V6 powering the Renault Alpine GTA/A610 sports car.

AMC/Jeep applications
AMC-Renault uses a fully integrated electronic engine control system made by Renix
The Renix electronic ignition system consists of a solid-state Ignition Control Module (ICM), a distributor, a crankshaft position sensor, and an Electronic Control Unit (ECU). The Renix ECU has a powerful microprocessor that was advanced technology for its time. It also incorporates an engine knocking sensor that allows the computer to know if detonation is occurring, thus allowing the computer to make adaptive control by individual cylinder corrections to prevent pinging. The knock detection uses the signal from a wide band accelerometer mounted on the cylinder head. Good signal to noise ratio is obtained primarily through angular discrimination.

The Renix system has more inputs than the later Mopar system and in some ways is more complex. Its knock sensor automatically tunes the spark advance curve to an optimum mix for each cylinder. Some Renix controlled engines will actually get better fuel economy using higher octane fuel. The system on the AMC 4.0 L is flexible allowing the use of a modified  camshafts and modifications to the cylinder heads without significant changes to the base computer.

The Renix computer was first used on 1986 AMC 2.5 L four-cylinder engines. The system improved the drivability of the Jeep Cherokee and Comanche over carbureted models. The power increase was also noticeable. The Renix system was used through the 1990 model year. Unfortunately, it is  handicapped because few scan tools can be "plugged in" to this on-board diagnostics computer. The Renix control system prior to 1991 can be tested only with Chrysler's DRB tester, and the diagnostic test modes for 1989 and later engines with SBEC controllers differ from those provided for 1988 and earlier models.

Model years:
 1986 - Renix TBI available on Jeep 2.5 L four-cylinder engines.
 1989 - Changed to Renix MPFI.
 1991 - Chrysler Corporation (then the owners of the Jeep brand replaced the Renix control system with OBD-I-compliant control electronics, the Chrysler HO EFI).

The Renix control system was only found on the 1987-1990 Jeep Cherokee and Comanche with AMC-designed engines (the control setup used with the  V6 was OBD-I General Motors, and the early Diesel was a  Renault turbodiesel I4 that used its own specific control setup.)

The Jeep Wrangler (YJ) did not get the AMC 4.0 engine until 1991, when it was accompanied by Chrysler-designed electronics as well. Until then, it retained the AMC  engine with a carburetor. No other Jeep vehicle was equipped with Renix electronic controls.

Operation
In a typical Jeep application, the ignition control module (ICM) is located in engine compartment. It consists of a solid-state ignition circuit, as well as an integrated ignition coil that can be removed and serviced separately. Electronic signals from the ECU to the ICM determine the amount of ignition timing or retard needed to meet engine power requirements. The ECU provides an input signal to the ICM. The ICM has outputs for a tach signal to the tachometer and a high voltage signal from the coil to the distributor. The crankshaft position sensor senses TDC (Top Dead Center) and BDC crankshaft positions, as well as engine rpm. This sensor is secured by special shouldered bolts to flywheel/drive plate housing and is not adjustable.

Inspection stations
The Renix control system is "pre-OBD" and therefore does not have a "Check Engine Lamp". It also does not "store" or "throw" Diagnostic Trouble Codes (DTCs) or "Parameter IDs" (PIDs). This is a common problem at vehicle inspection, particularly in California and other jurisdictions with emission standards. Most inspection stations are not aware and will try to explain the CEL/MIL "doesn't work".

Skoda applications
In the 1980s, Skoda manufactured a small number of rear-engined cars with Renix fuel injection. These were originally destined for Canada but ended up in Europe. These are usually known as 135 GLi or 135 RiC. Fuel system parts may be available from Chrysler-Jeep dealers.

Volvo applications
The Volvo 700 Series and some of the Volvo 300 Series used a B200K 2.0 L inline-4 naturally aspirated engine with Renix ignition and some 300 series Volvos with Renault powerplants. The 300 Volvo series is not known U.S. It was manufactured in the Netherlands (with a limited production of cars in Malaysia through CKD process).

All 300 series Volvo cars with gasoline engines came with Renix/Bendix ignition 1983 onwards until 1991 when production of the 300 series stopped.
 
Volvo "Redblock" engines equipped with Renix ignition: 
 B200K 1986 cc  Solex Cisac Z34 twin barrel carburetor 1985-1989
 B200E 1986 cc  Bosch LE-jetronic injected unit 1985-1989
 B200F 1986 cc  Bosch LU-jetronic injected and catalyzed engine 1987-1990
 B230K

Renault derived units with Renix ignition: 
 B18E(D) 1721 cc OHC engines in 400 series 1986-1988
 B172K 1721 cc OHC  Solex Cisaz Z32 twin barrel carburetor 1986-1989
 B14.4E/S 1397 cc OHV  Weber 32DIR twin barrel carburetor 1985-1991
 B14.3E/S 1397 cc OHV  single barrel Solex carburetor version 1983-1985
 B13.4E 1289 cc OHV  Weber 32DIR twin barrel carburetor unit aimed for the Finnish market (where 1.3 L was a tax-class) 1989-1991

B172K and B18 were based on the Renault FnN (n being 1, 2 or 3) engines from Renault, B14.x based on Renault C1J, both types were modified for Volvo to varying extent.

See also
 AMC Straight-6 engine
 AMC Engines
 List of Chrysler engines

Notes

References

External links
 
 
 
 
 
 

Renault
AMC engines
American Motors
Engine control systems
Engine technology
Jeep engines
Onboard computers
Bendix Corporation